d'Hondecoeter is a surname. Notable people with the surname include:

 Gijsbert d'Hondecoeter (1604–1653), Dutch painter
 Gillis d'Hondecoeter ( 1575–1638), Dutch painter, father of Gijsbert
 Melchior d'Hondecoeter ( 1636–1695), Dutch painter